Chalu is a town under the administration of Ninghai County, Zhejiang, China. , it administers Xingzhong Residential Neighborhood and the following 21 villages:
Chalu Village
Xiafan Village
Hutou Village
Zhao'an Village
Gankeng Village
Shanglikeng Village
Chaijia Village
Qianhoulou Village
Dudong Village
Shangjin Village
Meihua Village
Baixi Village
Dayan Village
Shanyang Village
Shangwuji Village
Gaotang Village
Quanfeng Village
Dingfeng Village
Lüjia Village
Guanfeng Village
Tianhe Village

References 

Township-level divisions of Zhejiang
Ninghai County